Tamara Ryan (born September 19) is an American voice actress who provides voices for English versions of Japanese anime series and video games. She is known for her anime roles as Falan from Magi: Adventure of Sinbad, Rose from Gundam Build Divers, Chianti from Case Closed Episode One: The Great Detective Turned Small and Dorothea from Sirius the Jaeger. She also voiced Android 18 and Vados in Dragon Ball Super.

Biography
She is associated with Bang Zoom! Entertainment and Funimation.

Filmography

Anime

Animation

Film

Video games

Awards and nominations

References

External links
 
 
 
 
 
 

1986 births
American video game actresses
American voice actresses
Living people
21st-century American actresses